Amb Andaura railway station is Situated in Amb Tehsil  of  Una district, Himachal Pradesh. Its code is AADR. It serves Gagret and Amb towns. The station consists of two Platforms and 3 Tracks  .  It provide   facilities including Drinking water and Sanitation. The station is serviced by the only broad-gauge line in Himachal Pradesh.

Major trains 
	New Delhi - Amb Andaura Vande Bharat Express 
Daulatpur Chowk–Jaipur Intercity Express
 Himachal Express
 Amb Andaura–Ambala DMU
 Amb Andaura–Nangal Dam Passenger
Amb Andaura–Ambala Cantt. Junction MEMU
22458 / 22457 Amb Andaura–Hazur Sahib Nanded Weekly Mail

References

Railway stations in Una district
Ambala railway division